Barbara Kyser-Collier (Quapaw Tribe) is a businesswoman and tribal administrator. Born in Oklahoma into the Beaver Clan, she has had a career in Quapaw tribal government.

She first worked at the Seneca Indian School in 1968. Kyser-Collier started working for the Quapaw Tribe in 1974. She advanced from a position as secretary/bookkeeper, to comptroller, and, eventually, tribal administrator. Kyser-Collier has been involved in the development of gaming casinos by the Quapaw Tribe.

In addition, she has served as secretary of the National Tribal Gaming Commissioners/Regulators, and she was the charter chairperson for the Oklahoma Tribal Gaming Regulators Association. "Working with Lloyd Buffalo and Walter King, she developed ideas for the Quapaw tribal flag; she drew the original design of the flag on cardboard."

References

Year of birth missing (living people)
Living people
American businesspeople
Quapaw Nation politicians